Shmaryahu Yosef Nissim Karelitz (July 19, 1926 – October 21, 2019) was an Orthodox Jewish rabbi and posek who served as the chairman of the beis din tzedek (rabbinical court) of Bnei Brak.

Biography 

Karelitz was born in 1926 in Kosava (Kossov), Vilnius province, Poland, presently in Belarus. He came to Israel in 1935 with his parents. 

Karelitz was a nephew of Rabbi Avrohom Yeshaya Karelitz, known as the Chazon Ish. (The latter's sister was Karelitz's mother). The Chazon Ish was a previous rabbinical spiritual leader of Bnei Brak. From the time of the Chazon Ish until Karelitz it was Rav Elazar Shach who was regarded as the pre-eminent leader.

In his youth, he studied in the Ponevezh Yeshiva. He also studied with his uncles, the Chazon Ish and the Steipler. His wife Leah (d. 2015) was the daughter of Rabbi Tzvi Hirsch Kopshitz of Jerusalem and the great-granddaughter of Rabbi Yosef Chaim Sonnenfeld.

Rav Karelitz died in Bnei Brak on October 21, 2019. His funeral was attended by tens of thousands, and he was eulogized by Rabbi Chaim Kanievsky, his first cousin, and by Rabbi Gershon Edelstein, Rosh Yeshiva of Ponevezh.

Rabbinic career
His rabbinical court handled various matters, including financial disputes, marriage conflicts, and conversions. He was also a member of the Vaad Halacha (Jewish legal council) of the Maayanei Hayeshua Hospital of Bnei Brak and the av beis din of the Bnei Brak neighborhood of Ramat Aharon.
Karelitz's beit din in Israel performs conversions on people who are residing illegally in the state of Israel. This means several things: (1) The conversion process goes against Israeli law which gives the state more reason to reject such conversions. (2) The converts, who often live many years illegally in Israel, are eventually forced to leave (deportation, or due to lack of financial means to support oneself).

Published works

Chut Shani
Hilchos Shabbos Vol. 1
Hilchos Shabbos Vol. 3
Hilchos Yom Tov
Hilchos Pesach
Hilchos Niddah
Hilchos Ribbis
Even Ha'ezer Siman 21
Hilchos Shmita ViYovel Vol. 1-2

References

Haredi rabbis in Israel
1926 births
2019 deaths
Lithuanian Haredi rabbis
Lithuanian emigrants to Mandatory Palestine
Rabbis in Bnei Brak